The Water Supply (Water Fittings) Regulations 1999 are  regulations imposed on the England and Wales Water industry by Statutory Instrument.

The regulations were signed jointly by Michael Meacher, Secretary of State for the Environment, Transport and the Regions and Jon Owen Jones, Parliamentary Under-Secretary of State for Wales.

Arrangement
The Regulations are divided into three parts and a further three Schedules are attached

Parts
Part I defines terms used and defines the scope of the regulations.

Part II specifies the requirements for water fittings; restrictions on the installation of water fittings; certification to be issued and notifications to be given.

Part III deals with enforcement, penalties, tests and disputes.

Schedules
Schedule 1 categorizes water into five categories for wholesomeness, while schedule 2 provides further explanation of terms used within the body of the regulations. Schedule 3 revokes previous water byelaws.

Fluid category 1
Wholesome water supplied by a water undertaker and complying with the requirements of regulations made under section 67 of the Water Industry Act 1991.

Fluid category 2
Water in fluid category 1 whose aesthetic quality is impaired owing to:
a) a change in its temperature, or
b) the presence of substances or organisms causing a change in its taste, odour or appearance, including water in a hot water distribution system.

Fluid category 3
Fluid which represents a slight health hazard because of the concentration of substances of low toxicity, including any fluid which contains:
a) ethylene glycol, copper sulphate solution or similar chemical additives, or
b) sodium hypochlorite (common in disinfectants).

Fluid category 4
Fluid which represents a significant health hazard because of the concentration of toxic substances, including any fluid which contains:

a) chemical, carcinogenic substances or pesticides (including insecticides and herbicides), or
b) environmental organisms of potential health significance.

Fluid category 5
Fluid representing a serious health hazard because of the concentration of pathogenic organisms, radioactive or very toxic substances, including any fluid which contains:
a) faecal material or other human waste;
b) butchery or other animal waste; or
c) pathogens from any other source.

References
 Water Supply (Water Fittings) Regulations 1999, HMSO

External links 
 The Water Supply (Water Fittings) Regulations 1999 at legislation.gov.uk

Statutory Instruments of the United Kingdom
Water supply and sanitation in England and Wales
1999 in British law